Action is a 1921 American silent Western film directed by John Ford and featuring Hoot Gibson. It was based on Peter B. Kyne's popular novel The Three Godfathers. The film is considered to be lost. According to contemporaneous newspaper reports, Action was based on J. Allan Dunn's novel, The Mascotte of the Three Star; Mascotte appeared as the lead novel in the pulp magazine Short Stories, February 1921.

Cast
 Hoot Gibson as Sandy Brouke
 Francis Ford as Soda Water Manning
 J. Farrell MacDonald as Mormon Peters
 Buck Connors as Pat Casey
 Clara Horton as Molly Casey
 William Robert Daly as J. Plimsoll
 Dorothea Wolbert as Mirandy Meekin
 Byron Munson as Henry Meekin
 Charles Newton as Sheriff Dipple
 Jim Corey as Sam Waters

See also
 Hoot Gibson filmography
 List of lost films

References

External links

 
 

1921 films
1921 lost films
1921 Western (genre) films
American black-and-white films
Films based on American novels
Films based on Western (genre) novels
Films directed by John Ford
Lost Western (genre) films
Lost American films
1920s English-language films
Silent American Western (genre) films
Universal Pictures films
1920s American films